Griveaudyria is a genus of tussock moths in the family Erebidae.

Species
Griveaudyria asymetrica (Dall'Asta, 1982)
Griveaudyria cangia (Druce, 1887)
Griveaudyria gabunica (Dall'Asta, 1982)
Griveaudyria glauca (Dall'Asta, 1982)
Griveaudyria ila (Swinhoe, 1904)
Griveaudyria kisanganiensis (Dall'Asta, 1982)
Griveaudyria lusamboensis (Dall'Asta, 1982)
Griveaudyria mascarena (Butler, 1878)
Griveaudyria melochlora (Hering, 1926)
Griveaudyria phaeosticta (Collenette, 1937)
Griveaudyria semotheta (Collenette, 1933)
Griveaudyria subcangia (Dall'Asta, 1982)
Griveaudyria subila (Dall'Asta, 1982)
Griveaudyria viridis (Dall'Asta, 1982)
Griveaudyria viridiumbrata (Dall'Asta, 1982)

References

Lymantriinae
Moth genera